The South Bay Incinerator was a trash incinerator located in Roxbury, Massachusetts. It is currently the site of the Greater Boston Food Bank.

External links
Information about the incinerator
Basic 3D model and location

Incinerators
Roxbury, Boston
Demolished buildings and structures in Massachusetts